Noël James de Mille (29 November 1909 – 6 March 1995) was a Canadian rower who competed in the 1932 Summer Olympics where, together with Ned Pratt., he won the bronze medal in the double sculls. Noel later moved to England but continued a keen interest in rowing. When war broke out he joined the Royal Air Force, serving as a flying officer. Following the war he married and settled in Glasgow. De Mille had a successful business career in housewares manufacturing. He and his wife Ailsa Ogilvie had a daughter Christina and two sons Andy and Peter. In 1986, at the age of 75, he attended the centennial event at the Vancouver Rowing Club, where he stepped back into a double for a row with club captain Bruce Trewin. He died in Thorpness, Suffolk, in 1995.

References

1909 births
1995 deaths
Canadian male rowers
Olympic rowers of Canada
Rowers at the 1932 Summer Olympics
Olympic bronze medalists for Canada
Olympic medalists in rowing
Medalists at the 1932 Summer Olympics
20th-century Canadian people